Top Model po-ukrainsky, cycle 5  is the fifth season of Top Model po-ukrainsky. Like previous season, the show introduced a division of also male models have a chance of winning the competition.

Among with the prizes was: a cash prize of 100,000₴, a cover of Pink Magazine in Ukraine, a trip to New York City sponsored by Maybelline, a modelling contract with K Models, and a Maybelline hampers.

The winner of the competition was 19-year-old Yana Kutishevska.

Sofi Beridze, returned for season 7. Sofi Beridze was eliminated in Episode 6.

Contestants 
(ages stated are at start of contest)

Episodes

Episode 1
Original airdate: 

This was the first casting episode. Out of a large group of model hopefuls only 30 would advance to the next round.

Episode 2
Original airdate: 

This was the second casting episode. The remaining 30 semi-finalists were narrowed down to the top 15.

Episode 3
Original airdate: 

Bottom two: Alisa Golovniova &  Ezedzhi Dzhonson Nnamdi
Eliminated:  Ezedzhi Dzhonson Nnamdi

Episode 4
Original airdate: 

Immune: Anna Troyan
Best photo: Denys Kovalyov
Bottom two: Ivan Kianyanitsa & Yasya Krutova
Eliminated: Ivan Kianyanitsa

Episode 5
Original airdate: 

Best photo: Katya Polchenko
Bottom two: Alisa Golovniova & Dima Sukach
Eliminated: Alisa Golovniova

Episode 6
Original airdate: 

Best photo: Yasya Krutova
Immune: Anna Troyan, Katya Polchenko, Sofi Beridze, Yana Kutishevska & Yuliya Dihan
Bottom two: Denys Kovalyov & Yehor Stepanenko
Eliminated: Denys Kovalyov

Episode 7
Original airdate: 

Bottom two: Serhiy Herdov & Yuliya Dihan
Eliminated: Serhiy Herdov

Episode 8
Original airdate: 

Best photo: Dima Toporynskiy
Bottom two: Maks Osadchuk & Sofi Beridze
Eliminated: Sofi Beridze

Episode 9
Original airdate: 

Best photo: Dima Sukach
Bottom two: Anna Troyan & Maks Osadchuk
Eliminated: Anna Troyan

Episode 10
Original airdate: 

Best photo: Yuliya Dihan
Bottom two: Dima Sukach & Katya Polchenko
Eliminated: Dima Sukach

Episode 11
Original airdate: 

Returned: Denys Kovalyov & Dima Sukach
Quit: Denys Kovalyov
Immune: Maks Osadchuk
Best photo: Yuliya Dihan
Bottom two: Yasya Krutova & Yehor Stepanenko
Eliminated: Yasya Krutova

Episode 12
Original airdate: 

Best photo: Yehor Stepanenko
Quit: Dima Toporinskiy
Bottom two: Katya Polchenko & Maks Osadchuk
Eliminated: None

Episode 13
Original airdate: 

Best photo: Katya Polchenko
Bottom two: Yuliya Dihan & Maks Osadchuk
Eliminated: Maks Osadchuk

Episode 14
Original airdate: 

Best photo: Katya Polchenko
Bottom two: Yana Kutishevska & Yehor Stepanenko
Eliminated: Yehor Stepanenko

Episode 15
Original airdate: 

Best photo: Yana Kutishevska
Bottom two: Yuliya Dihan & Katya Polchenko
Eliminated: None

Episode 16
Original airdate: 

Best photo: Yana Kutishevska
Bottom two: Yuliya Dykhan & Katya Polchenko
Eliminated: Yuliya Dykhan

Episode 17
Original airdate: 

Eliminated: Dima Sukach

Episode 18
Original airdate: 

The final 2 start their final challenges: At the sunflower field, where they shoot a motion editorial from a normal girl to a model; A final photoshoot as they show their personality along with all 13 eliminated contestant of this season, and they have a final runway show for Marina Ribalko. At the end, Yana became the winner of this season.

Final two:   Katya Polchenko & Yana Kutishevska
Ukraine's Next Top Model: Yana Kutishevska

Summaries

Results

 The contestant was in the bottom two
 The contestant was eliminated
  The contestant was originally eliminated, but was saved.
 The contestant quit the competition
 The contestant was immune from elimination
 The contestant won best photo
 The contestant won the competition

Photo shoot guide
Episode 2 photo shoots: Burlesque; show your personality
Episode 3 photo shoot: Cycling in groups
Episode 4 photo shoots: Compcard; posing topless
Episode 5 photo shoot: Mock covers
Episode 6 photo shoots: Dancing in pairs; portraying warriors in a battle
Episode 7 photo shoot: Posing with elders
Episode 8 photo shoots: Ice age love story; wrestlers
Episode 9 photo shoots: Drowned; anti-Christ inspired
Episode 10 photo shoot: Burden
Episode 11 photo shoots: Hangover; Embracing natural hair
Episode 12 photo shoots: David LaChapelle inspired; Glamping; Rococo
Episode 13 photo shoot: Red carpet
Episode 14 photo shoot: Shape of Water inspired
Episode 15 photo shoot: Vegas Showgirls and Showman; Ritual Shaman
Episode 16 photo shoot: Messy Greek Mythology Shoot; Underwater
Episode 17 photo shoot: Football
Episode 18 photo shoot: Personality along with previous eliminated contestant

References

Ukraine
2018 Ukrainian television seasons